The  Asian Men's Volleyball Championship was the fifth staging of the Asian Men's Volleyball Championship, a biennial international volleyball tournament organised by the Asian Volleyball Confederation (AVC) with Korea Volleyball Association (KVA). The tournament was held in Seoul, South Korea from 15 to 24 September 1989.

Preliminary round

Pool A

|}

|}

Pool B

|}

|}

Pool C

|}

|}

Pool D

|}

|}

Classification round
 The results and the points of the matches between the same teams that were already played during the preliminary round shall be taken into account for the classification round.

Pool E

|}

|}

Pool F

|}

|}

Pool G

|}

Pool H

|}

Final round

Classification 17th–19th

|}

Classification 13th–16th

Classification 9th–12th

Classification 5th–8th

5th place match
|}

Final four

Semifinals
|}

3rd place
|}

Final
|}

Final standing

References
Results

A
V
Asian men's volleyball championships
V